David Mark (October 7, 1947 - September 24, 2022) was a SUNY Distinguished Professor in the Department of Geography at the University at Buffalo, USA. He made several contributions to research and education in Geographic Information Science (GIScience), most recently in human spatial cognition and language.

Education and Professional career 
Mark worked at three universities between 1976 and 1978: Simon Fraser University, the University of Ottawa, and the University of British Columbia. He was an assistant professor of geography at the University of Western Ontario from 1978 to 1981. In 1981, he moved to the Department of Geography at the University at Buffalo as an assistant professor. Mark was promoted to associate professor in 1983 and to the rank of Professor in 1987. In 2007, he was conferred with the title of SUNY Distinguished Professor.

Awards

Contributions to Geographic Information Science 
Mark's specialty was in the field of Geographic Information Science (GIScience). He authored or coauthored more than 230 scholarly papers which have been cited over 10,000 times. He researched cognitive and linguistic foundations of how geographic information is conceptualized and used. In the 1970s and 1980s, he pioneered methods for representing topography for digital computers, including the earliest methods for the Triangular Irregular Network data model. He is credited for a popular water flow routing GIS algorithm, which specifies how to eliminate spurious pits from digital elevation models. In 1990, David Mark organized with Andrew U. Frank the NATO Advanced Study Institute in Las Navas del Marquez (Spain). This meeting was the origin of research in spatial cognition and linguistics for the field of GIScience. Mark co-authored several widely cited papers on geographic categorization, geographic reasoning, and the ontology of geographic features. In the early 2000s, Mark and Andrew Turk created the area of study called "Ethnophysiography" to study how language and culture are related to people's naïve conceptualizations of the physical landscape. Until his death, he continued to work on most of these topics, with special focus on establishing a foundational ontology of the landscape.

References 

Living people
University at Buffalo faculty
Geographic information scientists
Canadian geographers
Ontologists
1947 births